C. Everett "Ev" Bacon (August 18, 1890 – February 1, 1989) was an American football quarterback in college. He was also a star athlete in baseball, basketball, tennis, and golf.

Bacon was twice an All-American in football (1910 and 1912). He was "one of only two players not from an Ivy League institution on the 1912 team. One of the other All-Americans on the 1912 team was Jim Thorpe." As an undergraduate at Wesleyan University (class of 1913), Bacon helped pioneer the use of the forward pass.

In 1966, Bacon was inducted into the College Football Hall of Fame. Since 1936, Wesleyan has awarded the C. Everett Bacon Award to the institution's Most Valuable Football Player.

Wesleyan's Bacon Field House, a  field house, was named to honor him.

He is interred at the Indian Hill Cemetery in Middletown, Connecticut.

Notes

1890 births
1989 deaths
People from Westbrook, Connecticut
American football quarterbacks
Baseball pitchers
Burials at Indian Hill Cemetery
Wesleyan University alumni
Wesleyan Cardinals football players
Wesleyan Cardinals baseball players
Wesleyan Cardinals men's basketball players
Wesleyan Cardinals men's tennis players
College Football Hall of Fame inductees
Players of American football from Connecticut
American men's basketball players